Overload is Japanese heavy metal band Anthem's third studio album since their reformation in the year 2000.

The album has been considered by most critics to be much more aggressive than their previous album Seven Hills. This direction of blending both new and old styles into their own musical style became the force for their future releases.

Track listing 
 "Revenge" (Shibata) - 4:21
 "The Voices" (Shibata) - 3:47
 "Demon's Ride" (Shibata) - 4:26
 "Rough and Wild" (Shibata) - 4:07
 "Rescue You" (Sakamoto, Shibata) - 4:06
 "Ground Zero" (Shimizu) - 3:21
 "Overload" (Sakamoto, Shibata) - 4:28
 "Desert of the Sea (Sakamoto, Shibata) - 5:14
 "Gotta Go" (Sakamoto, Shibata) - 4:12
 "Eternal Mind" (Shimizu) - 4:18

Personnel

Band members
Eizo Sakamoto - vocals
Akio Shimizu - guitars
Naoto Shibata - bass, producer
Hirotsugu Homma - drums

Production
Chris Tsangarides - mixing
George Azuma - supervisor

References

2002 albums
Anthem (band) albums
Victor Entertainment albums